Kalen Ryden (born April 12, 1991) is an American soccer player who currently plays for New Mexico United in the USL Championship.

Career

College and Amateur
Ryden began his college career at Oral Roberts University where he played from 2009 to 2010. In his two seasons with the Golden Eagles, he made 35 appearances and tallied three goals and two assists. After the 2010 season, he left the Golden Eagles soccer program due to injury. However, he remained a student at Oral Roberts during the school year.

In 2012, Ryden transferred to Midwestern State University and redshirted his first season there due to transfer rules. During his time with the Mustangs, he made 28 appearances and tallied one goal and two assists.

Ryden also played in the Premier Development League for Des Moines Menace, Midland-Odessa Sockers and Austin Aztex.

Professional
On January 20, 2015, Ryden was selected in the fourth round (69th overall) of the 2015 MLS SuperDraft by Columbus Crew SC.  He signed a professional contract with the club on March 2.

On March 26, Ryden re-joined the Aztex, who moved up to the USL. Columbus sent him on loan to the club as part of the affiliation agreement. He made his professional debut three days later in a 2–0 victory over Colorado Springs Switchbacks FC.

On August 6, Ryden was waived by Crew SC.

Ryden signed with USL side Oklahoma City Energy on August 27, 2015.

On January 20, 2017, Ryden signed with NASL side Jacksonville Armada.

After two seasons in the USL Championship with Real Monarchs, Ryden moved to USL side New Mexico United ahead of their 2020 season.

Career statistics

References

External links

Midwestern State Mustangs bio

1991 births
Living people
American soccer players
Association football defenders
Austin Aztex players
Columbus Crew draft picks
Columbus Crew players
Des Moines Menace players
Jacksonville Armada FC players
Midland-Odessa Sockers FC players
Midwestern State Mustangs men's soccer players
New Mexico United players
North American Soccer League players
OKC Energy FC players
Soccer players from Oklahoma
Sportspeople from Norman, Oklahoma
USL Championship players
USL League Two players